is an interchange railway station located in Kōnan-ku, Yokohama, Kanagawa Prefecture, Japan, operated by the private railway operator Keikyū and the Yokohama Municipal Subway.

Lines
Kamiōoka Station is served by the Keikyū Main Line and the Yokohama Subway Blue Line (Line 1). It is 30.8 kilometers from the starting point of the Keikyū Main Line at Shinagawa Station and 13.8 kilometers from the terminus of the Blue Line at Shōnandai Station.

Station layout
Keikyū Kamiōoka Station is an elevated station with two island platforms serving four tracks. The underground Blue Line station has a single island platform and two tracks.

Keikyū platforms

Yokohama Municipal Subway platforms

History
Kamiōoka Station was opened on April 1, 1930 as a station on the Shōnan Electric Railway. The station building was rebuilt in 1963 to include a department store. The Yokohama Municipal Subway connected to Kamiōoka on December 16, 1972. A new station building was built from 1996-1998. Platform screen doors were installed at the underground platforms in September 2007.

Keikyū introduced station numbering to its stations on 21 October 2010; Kamiōoka Station was assigned station number KK44.

Passenger statistics
In fiscal 2019, the Keikyū station was used by an average of 143,758 passengers daily. During the same period, the Yokohama Municipal Subway was used by an average of 73,500 passengers daily,

The daily average passenger figures for previous years are as shown below.

Surrounding area
 Konan Ward Cultural Center "Sunflower Township"

See also
 List of railway stations in Japan

References

External links

 
 Station (Blue Line) 

Railway stations in Kanagawa Prefecture
Keikyū Main Line
Stations of Keikyu
Blue Line (Yokohama)
Stations of Yokohama City Transportation Bureau
Railway stations in Yokohama
Railway stations in Japan opened in 1930